Thomas Eugene Baker is a constitutional law scholar, Professor of Law, and founding member of the Florida International University College of Law. With four decades of teaching experience, Baker has authored eighteen books, including two leading casebooks, has published more than 200 scholarly articles in leading law journals, and has received numerous teaching awards.

Education
Baker graduated from Florida State University (B.S., 1974, cum laude), double majoring in economics and political science, and from the University of Florida College of Law (J.D., 1977, high honors), where he was a board member of the Florida Law Review and a Moot Court board editor and supervisor. He graduated in the top 3 percent of his class and was inducted into the Order of the Coif, the Phi Kappa Phi Honor Society, and the Omicron Delta Kappa National Leadership Society.

Professional career
After clerking in the United States Court of Appeals for the Fifth Circuit (1977–79), Baker worked at the Supreme Court of the United States as a Judicial Fellow (1985–86) and as acting administrative assistant to Chief Justice William H. Rehnquist (1986–87).

By appointment of the Chief Justice, Baker was a member of the Committee on Rules of Practice and Procedure (1990–95) for which he received a formal Commendation for Distinguished Service to the Federal Courts from the Judicial Conference of the United States. 

Baker served on the board of editors of the Journal of Supreme Court History (1991–93), the legal policy advisory board of the Washington Legal Foundation (1998–2012), the board of directors of the American Judicature Society (2000–02), and the advisory committee of the Journal of Legal Education (2012–15).

Baker is a Fellow of the American Bar Foundation and of the American Academy of Appellate Lawyers, and is a Life Member of the American Law Institute. In 2018, Baker was presented with the Albert Nelson Marquis Lifetime Achievement Award for career longevity and demonstrated excellence in legal education.

Teaching career
From 1979 to 1998, Baker was a faculty member at Texas Tech University School of Law, where he held the Alvin R. Allison Distinguished Professorship and received multiple awards for his teaching and research.

In 1998, Baker accepted the position as Director of the Constitutional Law Center at Drake University Law School, where he also held the James Madison Chair in Constitutional Law endowed by Congress.

In 2002, Baker became a founding faculty member of the Florida International University College of Law, where he teaches constitutional law. He is a recipient of the FIU Top Scholar Award (2012), the first-ever Pioneer Award for commitment and dedication to students from the FIU Student Bar Association (2004), the FIU Book Author Award (2012), and the FIU Faculty Recognition Award (2010). In addition, students have recognized his work by honoring him four times with the Professor of the Year Award.

Baker has been a visiting professor at prominent law schools, including the Fredric G. Levin College of Law at the University of Florida (1994) and at the Marshall-Wythe School of Law at the College of William and Mary (2007). He has also taught American constitutional law as a Distinguished Fulbright Professor at the University of Athens in Greece.

Publications
The following is a selection of Baker’s writings.

Casebooks
First Amendment Law: Freedom of Expression and Freedom of Religion (LexisNexis 4d ed. 2018) (with Arthur D. Hellman, William D. Araiza, & Ashutosh Bhagwat).
Appellate Courts: Structures, Functions, Processes, and Personnel (LexisNexis 2d ed. 2006) (with Daniel J. Meador & Joan E. Steinman).

Selected books
Constitutional Analysis in a Nutshell (West Academic Publ’g 3d ed. 2019).
Skills & Values: Constitutional Law (LexisNexis 2013) (with William D. Araiza, Olympia R. Duhart & Steven I. Friedland).
A Primer on the Jurisdiction of the U.S. Courts of Appeals (Federal Judicial Center 2d ed. 2009).
At War with Civil Rights and Civil Liberties (Rowman & Littlefield Publishers 2006) (editor with John F. Stack Jr.).
Amicus Humoriae: An Anthology of Legal Humor (Carolina Academic Press 2003) (with Robert M. Jarvis & Andrew J. McClurg).
Can a Good Christian Be a Good Lawyer? Homilies, Witnesses, and Reflections (University of Notre Dame Press 1998) (editor with Timothy W. Floyd).

Selected articles

 Dehors the Record: A Correction of a Final Jeopardy Question, 14 FIU L. REV. 709 (2021).
 A Modest Experiment in Pedagogy: Lessons on Comparative Constitutional Law, 6 FIU L. REV. 99-122 (2012).
Book Review: Jack M. Balkin & Reva B. Siegel, eds. The Constitution in 2020, 50 AMER. J. LEGAL HIST. 104-05 (2010).
Applied Freakonomics: Explaining the “Crisis of Volume,” 8 J. APP. PRAC. & PROC. 101-14 (2007).

Constitutional Theory in a Nutshell, 13 WM & MARY BILL RTS. J. 1 (2005).
Civil Rights and Civil Liberties in a Crisis: A Few Pages of History, 3 NEV. L. J. 23-28 (2002).
A Compendium of Clever and Amusing Law Review Writings—An Idiosyncratic Bibliography of Miscellany with In Kind Annotations Intended as a Humorous Diversion for the Gentle Reader, 51 DRAKE L. REV. 105 (2002).
A Case Study on the Importance of Settling the National Law: Why We Call the Supreme Court “Supreme,” 4 GREENBAG 2d 129-37 (Winter 2001).
The Supreme Nonet, 18 CONST. COMMENTARY 291-93 (2001) (review poem).
Towards a “More Perfect Union”—Some Thoughts on Amending the Constitution, 10 WIDENER J. PUB. L. 1 (2000).
Tyrannous Lex , 82 IOWA L. REV. 689 (1997).
A View to the Future of Judicial Federalism: “Neither Out Far Nor in Deep,” 45 CASE W. RES. L. REV. 705 (1995).
Intramural Reforms: How the U.S. Courts of Appeals Have Helped Themselves, 22 FLA. ST. UNIV. L. REV. 913-53 (1995).
Exercising the Amendment Power to Disapprove of Supreme Court Decisions: A Proposal for a “Republican Veto,” 22 HASTINGS CONST. L.Q. 325-57 (1995).
Imagining the Alternative Futures of the U.S. Courts of Appeals, 28 GA. L. REV. 913 (1994).
Taking Another Measure of the “Crisis of Volume” in the U.S. Courts of Appeals, 51 WASH. & LEE L. REV. 97-113 (1994) (with Denis J. Hauptly).
Why Congress Should Repeal the Federal Employers’ Liability Act of 1908, 28 HARV. J. ON LEGIS. 79 (1992).
The Impropriety of Expert Witness Testimony on the Law, 40 U. KAN. L. REV. 325-64 (1992).
Not Another Constitutional Law Course: A Proposal to Teach a Course on the Constitution, 76 IOWA L. REV. 739-61 (1991) (with James E. Viator).
A Course on the Constitution, 40 J. LEGAL EDUC. 530-32 (1990) (with James E. Viator).
Siskel and Ebert at the Supreme Court, 87 MICH. L. REV. 1472-1502 (1989).
The Need for a New National Court, 100 HARV. L. REV. 1400-1417 (1987) (with Douglas D. McFarland).
Thinking About Federal Jurisdiction—Of Serpents and Swallows, 17 ST. MARY'S L.J. 239 (1986).
Eighth Amendment Challenges to the Length of a Criminal Sentence: Following the Supreme Court “From Precedent to Precedent”, 27 ARIZ. L. REV. 25-74 (1985) (with Fletcher N. Baldwin, Jr.).
A Compendium of Proposals to Reform the United States Courts of Appeals, 37 U. FLA. L. REV. 225-95 (1985).
Dam Federal Jurisdiction!, 32 EMORY L.J. 3-87 (1983) (with Hon. James C. Hill).

References

External links
FIU College of Law Biography

Living people
University of Florida alumni
Florida State University alumni
Place of birth missing (living people)
Year of birth missing (living people)
American legal scholars
Florida International University College of Law faculty
Texas Tech University School of Law